Pol Pla Vegué (born 18 February 1993) is a Spanish rugby sevens player. He competed for the Spanish national rugby sevens team at the 2016 Summer Olympics. He was also part of the squad that won the last qualifying spot for the Olympics in Monaco.

Pla's older sister, Bárbara also competed at the Olympics for the Spanish women's sevens team.

References

External links 
 

1993 births
Living people
Spanish rugby union players
Spain international rugby union players
Rugby sevens players at the 2016 Summer Olympics
Olympic rugby sevens players of Spain
Spain international rugby sevens players
Sportspeople from Barcelona
Rugby union players from Catalonia